Davallia bullata, the squirrel's-foot fern, is a fern in the family Davalliaceae found mainly in Japan and China. It grows well in shady places. It grows from 20 to 35 cm. It has deciduous bullata and its leaflets are linear.

References

 The Botanical Magazine, Vol. XXIII. January, 1909.
 Flora of Japan, 1957, p. 22.

Davalliaceae
Flora of China
Flora of Japan